Regional health authorities (RHAs) are Manitoba's independent governing bodies for healthcare delivery and regulation. RHAs are overseen by their respective boards, who have responsibility for the mandate, resources, and performance of the health authority, responding directly to the provincial Minister of Health, Seniors and Active Living.

RHAs work under The Regional Health Authorities Act. The five RHAs that exist today were created as an amalgamation of eleven Health Authorities that were merged in 2012:

Interlake-Eastern Regional Health Authority
Northern Health Region
Prairie Mountain Health
Southern Health-Santé Sud
Winnipeg Regional Health Authority

In addition to the five regional health authorities, the three other independent health delivery organizations of Manitoba Health are Diagnostic Services Manitoba (DSM), CancerCare Manitoba (CCMB), and Addictions Foundation of Manitoba (AFM).

Until 2016, RHAs operated under the umbrella of the Regional Health Authorities of Manitoba, Inc. (RHAM), a non-profit corporation intended to facilitate interregional healthcare delivery in the province, pursuing joint activities of mutual benefit to the provincial RHAs. In 2019, Health Minister Cameron Friesen announced amendments to the Regional Health Authorities Act, which added Shared Health as a provincial health authority to take on similar responsibilities to the previous RHAM over province-wide healthcare coordination.

History 
Regional health authorities were created in 1997 to "better manage health care services" in Manitoba. In 1998, Regional Health Authorities of Manitoba, Inc. (RHAM) was established under the Corporations Act as a non-profit corporation created after the province's Regional Health Authorities discovered a need for a legal umbrella organization under which they could coordinate certain activities on a provincial basis.

In 2012, the eleven Health Authorities were merged by the Government of Manitoba to create the five larger RHAs that exist today.

In 2016, the RHAM Board of Directors and Membership voted in favour of a motion to dissolve RHAM and start distributing assets and discharging liabilities, effective 1 April 2017.

In 2019, under the Government of Premier Brian Pallister, Health Minister Cameron Friesen announced amendments to the Regional Health Authorities Act. Among these amendments, the provincial government planned to make Shared Health a new provincial health authority, and to change the legislation's name to the Health System Governance and Accountability Act. The amendments would also designate CancerCare Manitoba as the province's authority on cancer with legislative authority.

Governance and organizations

Board of directors 
Each Regional Health Authority is overseen by a board of directors, which has responsibility for its mandate, resources, and performance, responding directly to the provincial Minister of Health, Seniors and Active Living. (The Minister also appoints the members.) Members of these boards are required to represent their region as a whole, rather than particular communities or interests.

The boards are responsible for ensuring that their health authority complies with relevant legislation, regulations, provincial policies, and Ministerial directives. Boards have a strategic role in setting direction for the health authority and a fiduciary role in policy formulation, decision-making, and oversight.

The Winnipeg Regional Health Authority has 15 board members, while the rest of the health authorities—which are in the rural and northern regions of Manitoba—have 12 each. Board members were last appointed on 29 March 2020, by Health, Seniors and Active Living Minister Cameron Friesen.

Regions
While there were initially eleven Health Authorities, the Government of Manitoba merged these RHAs in 2012 to create the five larger RHAs that exist today.

* Note: While the town of Churchill is located in northern Manitoba, it is nonetheless administered by the WRHA.

Shared Health 
Shared Health is a centralized administrative organization that coordinates the delivery of healthcare services across the province of Manitoba—with initiatives that include planning for Health human resources, investing in capital equipment, and construction planning, among others. Developing clinical and preventive services, Shared Health works collaboratively with the Regional Health Authorities, as well as service-delivery organizations and communities.

The organization was established as a legal entity in 2018 to provide "centralized clinical and business services for the regional health authorities." It has been a central focus of reform of the healthcare system under the government of Premier Brian Pallister. In 2019, Health Minister Cameron Friesen announced amendments to the Regional Health Authorities Act that would give Shared Health legislative power and make it a new provincial health authority. Through this legislation, Shared Health would adopt: the operations of the Health Sciences Centre and certain mental health programs, which are currently overseen by the Winnipeg Regional Health Authority; and Selkirk Mental Health Centre and the Addictions Foundation of Manitoba, which are facilitated by Manitoba Health.

As of February 2021, executives of Shared Health include: Brock Wright, CEO; Lanette Siragusa, Chief Nursing Officer; and Perry Poulsen, Digital Health and Chief Information Officer.

See also
Health ministries and regions in western Canada

 Alberta Ministry of Health
 Alberta Health Services
 Calgary Health Region
 Capital Health
 Chinook Health
 David Thompson Regional Health Authority
 Palliser Health Region
 Peace Country Health Region
 BC Ministry of Health
 First Nations Health Authority
 Fraser Health
 Interior Health
 Island Health
 Northern Health
 Provincial Health Services Authority
 Vancouver Coastal Health
 Saskatchewan Ministry of Health
 Saskatchewan Health Authority

References

External links
 Regional health authorities in Manitoba
 Interlake-Eastern Regional Health Authority
 Northern Health Region
 Prairie Mountain Health
 Southern Health-Santé Sud
 Winnipeg Regional Health Authority
 Map 9 Manitoba Health Regions, Statistics Canada. 2018.